Ametor is a genus of water scavenger beetles in the family Hydrophilidae. There are at least two described species in Ametor.

Species
These two species belong to the genus Ametor:
 Ametor latus (Horn, 1873)
 Ametor scabrosus (Horn, 1873)

References

Further reading

 

Hydrophilinae
Articles created by Qbugbot